National Broadcasting Network known as NBN is the official television of the Lebanese Amal Movement.  The National Broadcasting Network s.a.l. NBN, is a Lebanese private company by shares, founded in 1996 by Lebanon’s Parliament Speaker and head of Amal movement, Nabih Berri, pursuant to Decree No. 10059 of January 10, 1998.

Ownership
The Berri family owns the station through three shareholders, Nabih Berri's siblings Mahmoud and Amina, as well as his sister-in-law Samira Assi, owning a total of 19.70%. The other major shareholders are close political allies of Berri and leading officials of the Amal Movement, from the Hamdan family (29.8%), Ahmad Hussein and NBN's CEO Kassem Soueid (10% each).

References

External links

 Amal Movement Official Site
 

1996 establishments in Lebanon
Television channels and stations established in 1996
International broadcasters
Television stations in Lebanon
Arab mass media
Arabic-language television stations